Víctor Eduardo Zapata (born 20 January 1979) is an Argentine retired football midfielder. Originally a pacey left winger, Zapata has developed his game as a deep-lying playmaker since his arrival to Vélez in 2007.

Club career

Zapata started his career in 1998 with Argentinos Juniors. In 1999, he moved to River Plate, where he won four league titles during his first spell with the club. During the 2003–04 season, he was loaned to Real Valladolid in the Spanish La Liga, but returned to River after Valladolid was relegated at the end of the season.

In 2007, Zapata joined Vélez Sársfield in a free transfer, after River denied the possibility of extending his contract. He was a regular starter in the team's 2009 Clausura championship, playing 18 of the 19 games (and scoring one goal). He also played 13 games as a starter (1 goal) in Vélez' 2011 Clausura winning campaign, his second Argentine league title with the club and sixth in his career.

International career

Under José Pekerman's coaching, Zapata played a friendly match with the Argentina national team in 2005. The game was a 1–1 draw with Mexico, in which Argentina had a squad formed exclusively by local league players.

Honours
River Plate
Argentine Primera División (4): 1999 Apertura, 2000 Clausura, 2002 Clausura, 2003 Clausura
Vélez Sársfield
Argentine Primera División (2): 2009 Clausura, 2011 Clausura

References

External links
 Profile at Vélez Sársfield's official website 
 
 
 

1979 births
Living people
People from San Martín, Buenos Aires
Argentine footballers
Argentine expatriate footballers
Association football midfielders
Argentine Primera División players
Primera Nacional players
Primera B Metropolitana players
Argentinos Juniors footballers
Club Atlético River Plate footballers
Club Atlético Independiente footballers
Chacarita Juniors footballers
Unión de Santa Fe footballers
Club Atlético Vélez Sarsfield footballers
La Liga players
Real Valladolid players
Expatriate footballers in Spain
Argentine expatriate sportspeople in Spain
Argentina international footballers
Sportspeople from Buenos Aires Province